Harvey Lavan "Van" Cliburn Jr. (July 12, 1934February 27, 2013) was an American pianist who achieved worldwide recognition in 1958, at the age of 23, when he won the inaugural quadrennial International Tchaikovsky Piano Competition in Moscow during the Cold War.

Recording career

Upon Cliburn's return to the United States, RCA Victor signed him to an exclusive contract and his subsequent recording of the Tchaikovsky Piano Concerto No. 1 won the 1958 Grammy Award for Best Classical Performance. It was certified a gold record in 1961, and it became the first classical album to go platinum, achieving that certification in 1989.

List of recordings

Most of Van Cliburn's recordings were originally issued on LP records, with some also issued on reel-to-reel, cassette, and 8-track tapes.  Most of Cliburn's recordings were reissued on Compact Disc when that format became available in the 1980s, in remasterings of variable quality.  Shortly before Cliburn's death, Sony Classical (which owns the RCA Victor Red Seal archives) released a newly remastered, Original Jacket Collection style boxed set, including Cliburn's complete RCA Victor recordings, with the exception of LSC 2807, Van Cliburn Conducts, Cliburn's sole recording as a conductor.

A number of recordings, mostly originating from live concerts, have been issued on some smaller labels, including Testament.

References 

Discographies of American artists
Discographies of classical pianists